Pleasant Ridge is a neighborhood in Cincinnati, Ohio. The population was 8,895 at the 2020 census.

The neighborhood is bordered by the cities of Norwood and Golf Manor, Amberley Village, the neighborhoods of Kennedy Heights and Oakley, and unincorporated Columbia Township.

History

John Cleves Symmes, congressman from New Jersey, purchased a vast tract of land between the two Miami rivers for less than a $1.00 an acre.
This was one of a series of forts built in the Symmes purchase. McFarland's Station was located on the border of what is now the neighborhoods of Kennedy Heights and Pleasant Ridge. Legend has it, the name Pleasant Ridge originated when a man named John Brewster, who had lost his wife and baby in childbirth, sought a spot for their burial. Upon reaching "a grassy spot...on the brow of a hill overlooking the Mill Creek Valley" another member of the party, Samuel Pierson, said "Here is a pleasant ridge"...

There were few settlers in those early years. Pleasant Ridge was developed at the site of an early crossroads. One road, an old Indian trail, wound between the mouth of the Little Miami River and what is now Reading. Originally called Columbia Road this trail became Ridge Road. The other road, a turnpike, was built by early settlers to connect Cincinnati to Zanesville and points east. In 1803, when the road was extended from Sharpsburg (Norwood) to Montgomery, it became known as the Montgomery Turnpike. With the arrival of the turnpike, Pleasant Ridge developed some stopping places for travelers, such as Sudler's Tavern and Auten's Tavern. The area was originally known as Cross Roads, because of the intersection of the Montgomery Pike and Columbia Road (Ridge). Ridge Road connected McFarland's Station with other stations in Carthage and Lockland.

Pleasant Ridge is approximately 9 miles from the center of downtown Cincinnati via Interstate 71. The tavern at the corner of what is now Ridge and Montgomery Roads in the center of the neighborhood was called the Nine-Mile House. This building is still standing (2017) at the Northwest corner of the intersection. It's obscured by a 1920s storefront and currently vacant. Cross the street and you can clearly see the original tin roof that's nearly 160 years old. Perfectly visible is the side of The Old Tavern/ Nine Mile House, with the original brick recently restored, that runs along Ridge Road...(with fire escape)

The Presbyterian Church moved from Duck Creek to its present site in 1800 with a school built nearby around 1819. The Church took the name Pleasant Ridge around 1818, and the community is said to have changed from Cross Roads to Pleasant Ridge in 1850.

The first permanent settler of Pleasant Ridge was James C. Wood in 1809. Wood bought  from Colonel McFarland in 1809 for $4.00 per acre. The family, including 10 children, lived in "the fort" until they built a house off Montgomery Pike, with brick burned on site. When James died in 1824, the land was divided among his heirs, and Pleasant Ridge was first platted.

The community of Pleasant Ridge grew slowly. In 1832, the year the post office opened, population was only 100. This was basically a farming community with a few businesses to serve farmers or travelers passing through the turnpike.

Pleasant Ridge was incorporated as a village in 1891 when its population exceeded 1,000. John H. Durrell, businessman and descendant of the original Wood family, became the first mayor. The village enacted certain improvements, such as board sidewalks and oil street lamps. The village had a council, policeman, lamplighter, and fireman.

The petition to be annexed by Cincinnati just 20 years later had a lot of opponents, but the proponents believed the added services would outweigh other disadvantages. Pleasant Ridge became part of Cincinnati on a vote of 260-174.

In 1904 the village made national news when the floor of the school's outhouse collapsed, and nine young girls drowned in the waste of the vault beneath.

Arts and entertainment
Pleasant Ridge is home to many artists and musicians. On October 11, 2008 Pleasant Ridge and neighboring community Kennedy Heights formed an Alliance called District A, a grassroots effort to build community partnerships and fuel economic development through the arts along the Montgomery Road corridor that is the main thoroughfare for both communities. Maria Kreppel, chairwoman of the Montgomery Corridor Arts Collaborative noted that Pleasant Ridge is an artistic community different from most in that "this is where artists choose to raise their families. We're not about building new art venues. Our ultimate goal is community development through the arts". The alliance was kicked off with a two-mile street festival featuring over 50 artists, musicians and businesses.

Notable people
Reed Ghazala, recognized as the "Father of Circuit Bending"

References

External links
 Community website

Neighborhoods in Cincinnati
Former municipalities in Ohio